The Helene Fischer Live 2017/2018 is a European concert tour by German singer Helene Fischer. It began on 12 September 2017, in Hannover, Germany at the TUI Arena and continued throughout Europe, finally concluding on 15 September 2018 in Arnhem at GelreDome.

The tour visited arenas throughout 2017 and 2018. According to reports, ticket sales had up to 500,000 after only just a few days on sale. For the summer of 2018, a stadium tour was also announced with 14 concerts in Europe, which will be her biggest tour to date.

According to Forbes, Fischer, who ist mostly unknown outside from German speaking Europe, earned from June 2017 to June 2018 over $30,000,000 and placed at No.8 on the list, earning more than Britney Spears and Celine Dion.

The Arena Tour is created in collaboration with 45 Degrees ( in April 2019, it become "Cirque du Soleil Events + Experiences")[1] and with Stufish Entertainment Architects [2]
The Stadium-Tour "Spürst Du Das" is created with Stufish Entertainment Architects [3]

Set list
{{hidden
| headercss = background: #FFE6FF; font-size: 100%; width: 90%;
| contentcss = text-align: left; font-size: 100%; width: 90%;
| header = 2017/2018 - Die Arena-Tournee
| content = 
This setlist was obtained from the concert of 12 September 2017 held at TUI Arena in Hannover. It may not represent all shows throughout the tour.
 "Intro"
 "Nur mit Dir"
 "Phänomen"
 "Das volle Programm"
 "Schmetterling"
 "Weil Liebe nie zerbricht"
 "Mit keinem Andern"
 "Ich will immer wieder... dieses Fieber spür'n"
 "Sowieso"
 "Und morgen früh küss ich dich wach"
 "Die schönste Reise"
 "Ich wollte mich nie mehr verlieben"
 "Wenn Du lachst"
 "Hit Medley" (Hundert Prozent / Du fängst mich auf und lässt mich fliegen / Von hier bis Unendlich / Die Hölle morgen früh)
 "Lieb mich dann"
 "Du hast mich stark gemacht"
 "Mit jedem Herzschlag"
 "Herzbeben"
 "Dein Blick"
 "Mit dem Wind"
 "Wir Zwei"
 "Fehlerfrei"
 "Wir brechen das Schweigen"
 "Achterbahn" (Afrojack Mash Up)
 "Flieger"
Encore
  "Unser Tag"
  "Atemlos durch die Nacht"
}}

{{hidden
| headercss = background: #FFE6FF; font-size: 100%; width: 90%;
| contentcss = text-align: left; font-size: 100%; width: 90%;
| header = 2018 - Die Stadion-Tournee
| content = 
This setlist was obtained from the concert of 23 June 2018 held at Red Bull Arena (Leipzig) in Leipzig. It may not represent all shows throughout the tour.
 "Intro"
 "Flieger"
 "Phänomen"
 "Fehlerfrei"
 "Hit Medley" (Feuerwerk / Mitten im Paradies / Hundert Prozent)
 "Viva la vida / Sonne auf der Haut"
 "Und morgen früh küss' ich dich wach"
 "Lieb' Mich"
 "Von hier bis unendlich"
 "Verdammt, ich lieb’ Dich" (Matthias Reim cover)
 "90's Medley" (Rhythm Is a Dancer / What is Love / I Like to Move It)
 "Mit dem Wind"
 "Unser Tag"
 "Freiheit" (Westernhagen cover)
 "Wir brechen das Schweigen"
 "Atemlos durch die Nacht"
 "Sowieso"
 "Ich will immer wieder... dieses Fieber spür'n"
 "Die Hölle morgen früh"
 "Herzbeben"
 "Mit keinem Andern"
 "Nur mit Dir" (Acoustic)
Encore
  "Achterbahn" (Afrojack Mash Up)
}}

Shows

References

Notes

Citations 

2017 concert tours
2018 concert tours